The first season of Supermodel Me aired in 2009, with the shooting location in Singapore.

The judging panel this season include Charmaine Harn, Geoff Ang, Jeanette Ejlersen, Olivier Henry and Grace Lee. Special appearances for the show included: Andrew Tan, Elaine Daly, David Gan, Frederick Lee, Marcus A. C, Lee Zhaun, Patrick Sin, Rizal Ahyar, Rick Tan, Furqan Saini, and more. 

This season will feature 10 contestants; three from Australia, two each from Malaysia and Singapore, and one each from South Korea Thailand and The United States. The prizes for this cycle were a cash prize of 10,000S$ value FEVO Mastercard, a cover shoot with JetStar Asia inflight magazine, four days three nights stay at Somerset Azabu East in Tokyo, an Acer F900 Windows Mobile Phone, a Redken & M.A.C. hampers and a modelling contract with Diva Models.

The winner was 17-year-old Evelyn Alice Lee-Ann Leckie from Australia.

Contestants
(Ages stated are at time of contest)

Episodes

Results table

 The contestant won Supermodel Me.
 The contestant was a runner-up.
 The contestant was eliminated in the finale.
 The contestant won the challenge.
 The contestant received positive critiques and was ultimately declared safe.
 The contestant received negative critiques but was ultimately declared safe.
 The contestant was eliminated.

In episode 1, no one was eliminated
In episode 9, there is no elimination

Photo shoot guide
Episode 1 photo shoot: Guerilla-style catwalk
Episode 2 photo shoot: Her World magazine cover
Episode 3 photo shoot: Trampoline shot
Episode 4 photo shoot: Human trafficking
Episode 5 photo shoot: B&W beauty shoot
Episode 6 photo shoot: Posing at the construction
Episode 7 photo shoot: Ploating in the water with squid
Episode 8 photo shoot: Photoshoot with Bangladeshi workers
Episode 9 photo shoots: B&W Nude; Lingerie in ice
Episode 10 photo shoots: Vintage ladies; Circus; Bikini with male models

References

2009 Singaporean television seasons